Weldy is a given name and a surname. Notable people with the surname include:

Weldy Walker (1860–1937), American baseball player
Weldy Young (1871–1944), Canadian businessman and athlete
 Ann Weldy (born 1932), American author